Baron Kirkwood, of Bearsden in the County of Dunbarton, is a title in the Peerage of the United Kingdom. It was created in 1951 for the Scottish engineer, trade unionist, Independent Labour Party and later Labour politician David Kirkwood.  the title is held by his grandson, the third baron, who succeeded his father in 1970.

Barons Kirkwood (1951)
 David Kirkwood, 1st Baron Kirkwood (1872–1955)
 David Kirkwood, 2nd Baron Kirkwood (1903–1970)
 David Harvie Kirkwood, 3rd Baron Kirkwood (born 1931)

The heir presumptive is the present holder's brother Hon. James Stuart Kirkwood (b. 1937).
The heir presumptive's heir presumptive is his first cousin David Kirkwood (b. 1945).
The heir presumptive's heir presumptive's heir apparent is his son Douglas James Kirkwood (b. 1974).

Line of Succession

  David Kirkwood, 1st Baron Kirkwood (1872—1955)
  David Kirkwood, 2nd Baron Kirkwood (1903—1970)
  David Harvie Kirkwood, 3rd Baron Kirkwood (b. 1931)
 (1) Hon. James Stuart Kirkwood (b. 1937)
 Hon. James Smith Kirkwood (1912—1983)
 (2) Colonel David Kirkwood (b. 1945)
 (3) Douglas James Kirkwood (b. 1974)
 (4) David Angus Kirkwood (b. 1978)
 (5) Robert Cameron Kirkwood (b. 1981)
 (6) James Marshall Smith Kirkwood (b. 1954)

Notes

References

Sources
 Kidd, Charles, Williamson, David (editors). Debrett's Peerage and Baronetage (1990 edition). New York: St Martin's Press, 1990, 
 

Baronies in the Peerage of the United Kingdom
Noble titles created in 1951
Noble titles created for UK MPs